John Gierach is an American author and freelance writer who formerly resided on the St. Vrain River in Lyons, Colorado and now lives in Larimer County, Colorado. His books are based on his various fly fishing adventures, some of which take place with his friend, A.K. Best. A few of his works include The View from Rat Lake, Even Brook Trout Get the Blues, and the cult classic, Trout Bum, which popularised the term "trout bum".

His work has appeared in Gray's Sporting Journal, Field & Stream, where he is a contributing author, and Fly, Rod, and Reel, where he is an editor at large. He also writes columns for the Longmont Daily Times-Call out of Longmont, Colorado, the monthly Redstone Review, and a monthly column for The New York Times.

Gierach was the 1994 recipient of the US Federation of Fly Fishers Roderick Haig-Brown Award. The award recognizes a fly fishing author whose work embodies the philosophy and spirit of Roderick Haig-Brown, particularly a respect for the ethics and traditions of fly fishing and an understanding of rivers, the inhabitants and their environments.

John Gierach's Archival Collection can be found at Montana State University, as well as an oral history conducted by MSU pertaining to Gierach's life as an angler and an angling writer.  John graduated from Findlay College in Ohio with a degree in philosophy

Selected bibliography

Sole works
Signs of Life (1977)
Fly-fishing the High Country (1984)
Trout Bum (1986)
The View from Rat Lake (1988)
Fly-fishing Small Streams (1989)
Sex, Death, and Fly-Fishing (1990)
Where the Trout Are All as Long as Your Leg (1991)
Even Brook Trout Get the Blues (1992)
Dances with Trout (1994)
Another Lousy Day in Paradise (1996)
Fishing Bamboo (1997)
Standing in a River Waving a Stick (1999)
Good Flies: Favorite Trout Patterns and How They Got That Way (2000)
Death, Taxes, And Leaky Waders: A John Gierach Fly Fishing Treasury (2000)
At the Grave of the Unknown Fisherman (2003)
The Fly Fishing Anthology (2004, contributor with Mallory Burton and Ernest Hemingway)
Still Life with Brook Trout (2005)
Fool's Paradise (2008)
No Shortage of Good Days (2011)
 All Fishermen are Liars (2014)
  A Fly Rod of Your Own (2017)
 Dumb Luck and the Kindness of Strangers (2020)
 All the Time in the World (2023)

Co-authored with A.K. Best
 A. K. Best's Fly Box: How to Tie the Master Fly-Tyer's Patterns
 A. K. Best's Advanced Fly Tying: The Proven Methods and Techniques of a Master Professional Fly Tyer--37 Important Patterns
 Dyeing and Bleaching Natural Fly-Tying Materials
 Production Fly Tying - A Collection Of Ideas, Notions, Hints, & Variations On The Techniques Of Fly Tying

References

Living people
Year of birth missing (living people)
American sportswriters
Angling writers
People from Lyons, Colorado